Philippine College of Ministry (PCM) is a four-year undergraduate Christian Bible college in Baguio, Philippine. It is a non-denominational institution (founded in 1992) but is considered to be part of the Stone-Campbell Restoration Movement and is associated with the Christian Churches/Churches of Christ.

History
s to offer four-year undergraduate programmes.    
In 1991, the Philippine Christian Mission Baguio Team began plans to establish a Bible college in Baguio. The team had discovered that there were insufficient Filipino leaders for the churches being established in the western Cordillera mountains of northern Luzon. The team consisted of Dennis McKinney, Mike Carman, Arnold Pasion, Sol Perillo, Steve Hong, Chris McKinney, and Scott McKinney.

The team invited Samson Lubag, a well-known Filipino leader to be the first president of the college.  The idea of a new college was promoted during the 1991 National Convention of the Churches of Christ in the Philippines.  It was decided that the college would focus its efforts on training pastors for ministry in local churches.  This led to the name Philippine College of Ministry (PCM).

On June 12, 1992, PCM was opened in a three-story building at 140 T. Alonzo Street, Baguio City.  There were 12 students (eight full-time, four part-time).  The faculty consisted of Samson Lubag and the five American Missionaries on the team.  The first floor of the building held the Business Office, the second floor served as the women’s dormitory, and the third floor held the library and classroom.  The furniture and equipment consisted of a piano, three manual typewriters, a large chalkboard, and a ping pong table which served as the only classroom with benches for seating.

In 1993, the college moved to Camp 7, Kennon Road, the former Ruff Hause Hotel, about five kilometers from the center of Baguio.  This new location offered relatively spacious accommodations for classes, dormitories, and office space, but by 2000 it was clear that the campus was too small for the growing student body.  

In 1997, Dennis McKinney and Samson Lubag invited Dr. James Huckaba and his wife, Linda, to join the college.  They arrived in September 1998.  Dr. Huckaba began serving as academic dean and professor of Greek and Homiletics.  Linda has served as the PCM business administrator, registrar, and part-time instructor.

On December 21, 1999, PCM founder Dennis McKinney died.  Hundreds of people came from all over the Philippines and from America to honor his life and mourn his death.  Dennis’ widow, Lorrita McKinney established the Dennis McKinney Memorial Building Fund with the goal of raising enough money to purchase land for a permanent PCM campus.  This goal was foremost in Dennis’ heart when he died.

In December 2002, PCM purchased 7,500 square meters of land in LamTang, La Trinidad, and donors were sought to fund the construction of a campus.  Within two years enough money had been donated to build a basic campus.  Groundbreaking took place on September 1, 2004 and construction began in earnest.

On June 13, 2005, PCM began the new academic year on the newly finished campus.  The new campus has complete facilities for up to 100 students with dormitory space for 64.  

Other significant milestones in the history of Philippine College of Ministry include 1994, enrollment of 24;  1997, enrollment of 28; October 1998, standardization of degree programs; December 1998, first official catalog; January 1999, major expansion of the library; March 1999, Alumni Association established; June 1999, music concentration added; June 1999, computer lab and courses added; November 1999, registration with the Securities and Exchange Commission (SEC); November 1999, recognition as a college by (CHED); November 1999, Board of Trustees established; December 2000, recognition by the Association for Theological Education in South East Asia (ATESEA); May 2003, resignation of Samson Lubag as president and appointment of Steve Hong as interim president; October 2003, establishment of the college website, http://www.pcm.ph; June 2004, establishment of the Ministry Development Program; November 2004, Rogelio Tenorio becomes president; 2006, enrollment of 48; March 2007, resignation of president Tenorio and appointment of Steve Hong as president; June 2007, enrollment of 58.

Degree programs
PCM offers the following programs of study:
 The Associate of Theology — a two-year degree program that prepares the student for an associate ministry or for ministry in a rural setting.
 The Bachelor of Theology — a four-year degree program that prepares the student for the ministry on a professional level.  The Bachelor of Theology with language requires two years of language, either two years of Hebrew or two years of Greek or one year each of Greek and Hebrew.

References
Directory of the Ministry; A Yearbook of the Christian Churches and Churches of Christ, 49th ed., Springfield, IL: Directory of the Ministry, 2007.

External links
 

Universities and colleges in Baguio
Protestant schools in the Philippines